Monkton Coke Works was a coking plant near Hebburn, Tyne and Wear, England.

History
The works were constructed in 1936, as the government's response to the Jarrow Hunger March in 1932. The plant closed in 1990 and was demolished in 1992. In September 2022, a book called CLEAN AIR was released on Amazon, detailing the campaign for clean air that the community living next to Monkton Coke Works led.

References

External links
YouTube - Monkton coke works slideshow.
YouTube - Monkton coke works compilation
YouTube - Monkton coke works

Buildings and structures in the Metropolitan Borough of South Tyneside
Demolished buildings and structures in England
Buildings and structures demolished in 1992